The International Council for Traditional Music (ICTM) is a scholarly non-governmental organization which focuses on the study, practice, documentation, preservation, and dissemination of traditional music and dance of all countries. Founded in London on 22 September 1947, it publishes the Yearbook for Traditional Music once a year and the Bulletin of the ICTM three times a year. The organization was previously known as The International Folk Music Council (IFMC). In 1949, it helped found the UNESCO International Music Council and remains a non-governmental organization in formal consultative relations with UNESCO.

Conferences
ICTM conferences have been held since 1948 and are presently biennial. In 2009, the site of the ICTM World Conference was Durban, South Africa, in 2011 it was St. John's Newfoundland, in 2013 Shanghai, China, in 2015 Nur-Sultan, Kazakhstan, in 2017 Limerick, Ireland, and in 2019 it was in Bangkok, Thailand. The 2021 conference was postponed until July 2022 due to the COVID-19 pandemic.

Publications
 Yearbook for Traditional Music (originally known as the Journal of the International Folk Music Council from 1949–1958)
 Bulletin of the ICTM (originally known as Bulletin of the IFMC)

World Network 
The Council is represented by individuals, called Liaison Officers, and representatives of organisations, called National and Regional Committees. They all act as links between the Council and the community of individuals and organizations involved with traditional music and dance in their country or region.

As of January 2019, the International Council for Traditional Music is officially represented in 129 countries or regions.

Presidents

 Svanibor Pettan (2021-2025)
 Salwa El-Shawan Castelo-Branco (2013-2021)
 Adrienne L. Kaeppler (2005-2013)
 Krister Malm (1999-2005)
 Anthony Seeger (1997-1999)
 Erich Stockmann (1982-1997)
 Poul Rovsing Olsen (1977-1982)
 Klaus P. Wachsmann (1973-1977)
 Willard Rhodes (1967-1973)
 Maud Karpeles, Honorary President (1963-1976)
 Zoltán Kodály (1961-1967)
 Jaap Kunst (1959-1960)
 Ralph Vaughan Williams (1947-1958)

References

External links
 Official site

Arts organizations established in 1947
Dance research
Ethnomusicology
UNESCO
1947 establishments in England
International organisations based in London